Colin Falls (born June 9, 1985) is an American basketball player who spent the 2007–08 season with Orlandina Basket of Italy. A 6'5" (196 cm) shooting guard born in Park Ridge, Illinois, Falls starred at Loyola Academy in Wilmette, Illinois and played four seasons for the University of Notre Dame, where he became the first player in school history to make more than 100 three-point field goals in a single season.

Notes

1985 births
Living people
American expatriate basketball people in Italy
American expatriate basketball people in the Czech Republic
American men's basketball players
Basketball players from Illinois
Irish men's basketball players
Notre Dame Fighting Irish men's basketball players
Shooting guards
Sportspeople from Park Ridge, Illinois